Relations between the European Union (EU) and the People's Republic of China (PRC) or Sino–European relations are bilateral relations that were established in 1975 between the PRC and the European Community. The EU is the PRC's largest trading partner, and the PRC is the EU's largest trade partner.

Since March 2019, the European Union has referred to China as a "systemic rival". In December 2020, the European Union and China announced that they reached an investment deal that was first launched in 2013, referred to as the Comprehensive Agreement on Investment (CAI). In March 2021, it was reported that there would be serious doubts about the approval of the deal in the European Parliament given China's sanctions against members of the parliament, the European Councils Political and Security Committee, and European think tanks. In May 2021, the European Commission announced plans to reduce dependence on China in strategic areas of the economy. The same month, the European Parliament froze ratification of the CAI. The EU has put an arms embargo and numerous anti-dumping measures against the PRC in place.

Agreements

Relations are governed by the 1985 EU-China Trade and Cooperation Agreement. Since 2007, negotiations have been underway to upgrade this to a new European Union Association Agreement and there are already 24 sectoral dialogues and agreements from environmental protection to education.

The EU–China Comprehensive Agreement on Investment (CAI) has been under negotiation since 2014. DG Trade Phil Hogan in the Von der Leyen Commission promised during his September 2019 confirmation hearings that he would seek to complete the negotiations by the end of 2020.

History

Prior to the existence of the European Community, many European states had relations with the Ming dynasty as early as the 16th century. The most important relationship, apart from Britain-China connected China with France and Germany.

In 1979, just after the first direct elections to the European Parliament, the later institution established the "Delegation for relations with the People's Republic of China" (D–CN).

After the end of the Cold War in 1990, relations with Europe were not as important as its relations with the US, Japan and other Asian powers. However interest in closer relations started to rise as economic contacts increased and interest in a multipolar system grew. Although initially imposing an arms embargo on China after the 1989 Tiananmen Square protests and massacre (see arms embargo section below), European leaders eased off China's isolation. China's growing economy became the focus for many European visitors and in turn Chinese businessmen began to make frequent trips to Europe. Europe's interest in China led to the EU becoming unusually active with China during the 1990s with high-level exchanges. EU-Chinese trade increased faster than the Chinese economy itself, tripling in ten years from US$14.3 billion in 1985 to US$45.6 billion in 1994.

However, political and security co-operation was hampered with China seeing little chance of headway there. Europe was leading the desire for NATO expansion and intervention in Kosovo, which China opposed as it saw them as extending US influence. However, by 2001 China moderated its anti-US stance in the hopes that Europe would cancel its arms embargo but pressure from the US led to the embargo remaining in place. Due to this, China saw the EU as being too weak, divided and dependent on the US to be a significant power. Even in the economic sphere, China was angered at protectionist measures against its exports to Europe and the EU's opposition to giving China the status of market economy in order to join the WTO.

However, economic cooperation continued, with the EU's "New Asia Strategy", the first Asia–Europe Meeting in 1996, the 1998 EU-China summit and frequent policy documents desiring closer partnerships with China. Although the 1997 Asian financial crisis dampened investors enthusiasm, China weathered the crisis well and continued to be a major focus of EU trade. Chinese leaders were anxious to return the European interest and made high level visits throughout the 1990s, visits that were accompanied by major EU sales to China. Trade in 1993 saw a 63% increase from the previous year. China became Europe's fourth largest trading partner at this time. Even following the financial crisis in 1997, EU-Chinese trade increased by 15% in 1998.

France was leading the EU's desire for closer ties in order to establish a multipolar world and was the first, along with Russia, to establish strategic partnerships with China. Relations between the European Union and China have experienced a cool down after China canceled the EU-China yearly summit in November 2008. This was apparently caused due to French President Sarkozy's plans to meet with the Dalai Lama.

The EU-China 2020 Strategic Agenda for Cooperation, adopted in 2013, calls for cooperation in the areas of "peace, prosperity, sustainable development and people-to-people exchanges." In the document, the EU reaffirmed its respect for China's sovereignty and territorial integrity, while the PRC reaffirmed its support to EU integration. In 2016, the EU adopted the "Joint Communication on elements for a new EU strategy on China" as its strategy on China. An annual EU–China Summit is held each year to discuss political and economic relations as well as global and regional issues.

On the 16th of October 2018, the European Union Naval Force and the Chinese People's Liberation Army Navy held for the first time ever a joint military exercise. The exercise took place at a Chinese military base in Djibouti and was completed successfully. Rear Admiral Alfonso Perez De Nanclares said that preparations for future exercises with the Chinese Navy are currently taking place.

China sent medical aid and supplies to EU countries affected by the COVID-19 pandemic. EU foreign policy chief Josep Borrell warned that there is "a geo-political component including a struggle for influence through spinning and the ‘politics of generosity’." Borrell also said that "China is aggressively pushing the message that, unlike the US, it is a responsible and reliable partner." During the 2020 China-EU summit, European Council President Charles Michel stated that "Europe is a player, not a playing field" regarding its relationship with China. In December 2020, the EU announced that the Comprehensive Agreement on Investment was concluded in principle. Some analysts said the Agreement may damage relations with the US.

In 2021, a diplomatic spat between Lithuania and China over Taiwan and human rights spilled over to the rest of the EU when China banned the import of goods which contained Lithuanian parts potentially disrupting integrated supply chains in the common market. EU Ambassador to China Nicolas Chapuis supported Lithuania and attempted to intervene on their behalf. The president of the EU Chamber of Commerce in China described the Chinese government's move as "unprecedented." Major German, French, and Swedish companies have been impacted by the ban. The Bundesverband der Deutschen Industrie described the ban as a “devastating own goal.” However, in 2022, the German Chamber of Commerce warned Lithuania that German-owned factories will be closed if relations with China are not improved.

Trade
The EU is China's largest trading partner, and in 2020, China overtook the US in becoming the EU's largest trade partner in terms of goods. Most of this trade is in industrial and manufactured goods. US is still EU's leading partner when services are included in the calculation.  Between 2009 and 2010 alone EU exports to China increased by 38% and China's exports to the EU increased by 31%.

On the 31st of December 2020, the EU announced that the negotiations for the Comprehensive Agreement on Investment were concluded and the deal is pending ratification by the European Parliament. The deal is viewed as a significant step towards market liberalisation in China and "the most ambitious agreement that China has ever concluded" by significantly opening up its internal market to EU companies.

Trade in goods 
In 2016, the EU-China bilateral trade in goods were €514.8 billion. Machinery and vehicles dominate both exports and imports. The top five exports of China are computers, broadcasting equipment, telephones, office machine parts and integrated circuits. China's top five imports are crude petroleum, integrated circuits, iron ore, gold and cars.
For what concerns the EU imports of AMA/NAMA product groups  the part for industrial products counts for a value of €343.725 million and gets the impressive percentage of 98.1% (of a total of €350.535 million). The same applies for exports to China where industrial products keep the highest ranking in the list and count for €159,620 million (93.7% of the total export volume).

Trade in services 
Trade of services play an important role in all modern economies. A resilient tertiary service sector, as well as an increased availability of services, may boost economic growth and enhance industrial performance. In an increasingly localised world, services such as finance, insurance, transport, logistics and communications deliver key intermediate inputs and thereby provide crucial support to the rest of the economy.
The European Union representing its 27 Member States and China are both members of the World Trade Organisation (WTO) and participate in the ongoing discussions about the Trade in Services Agreement (TiSA). The volume of trade in services of all participating countries corresponds to 70% of the world's total volume. TiSA is an important tool to increase the share of services trade by tackling the existing barriers. With TiSA new opportunities for service providers will be offered while fostering growth, jobs and prosperity at all participating Members.
According to the latest statistical information from Eurostat, the EU trade in services balance with China in 2015 present a surplus of €10.3 billion due to a surge of exports (exports reached €36 billion while imports €25.7 billion).

Smart and Secure Trade Lanes (SSTL) project 
The SSTL project was launched in 2006 as a pilot project between the European Union and China as the first Asian country. The participating EU member states at the time were the Netherlands and the United Kingdom. As from 2010 (when the second phase of the project was launched) other EU member states joined: Belgium, France, Germany, Italy, Poland and Spain. This project tests safety and security related recommendations of the World Customs Organisation Framework of Standards applied to containers, facilitating the "Customs-to-Customs" data exchange, risk management cooperation, mutual recognition of customs controls and trade partnership programmes. The 120 trade lanes involving 200 economic operators between 16 maritime ports will undoubtedly facilitate trade between China and EU participating countries as loading and unloading of containers will require less controls and intervention of Customs authorities.

There have been some disputes, such as the dispute over textile imports into the EU (see below). China and the EU are increasingly seeking cooperation, for example China joined the Galileo project investing €230 million and has been buying Airbus planes in return for a construction plant to be built in China; in 2006 China placed an order for 150 planes during a visit by French President Jacques Chirac. Also, despite the arms embargo, a leaked US diplomatic cable suggested that in 2003 the EU sold China €400 million of "defence exports" and later, other military grade submarine and radar technology.

Science and technology 
China and the EU launched their first science and technology cooperation program in 1983. They also drafted an Agreement on Scientific and Technological Cooperation in 1998 which was renewed in 2004 with the aim of linking research organisations, industry, universities and individual researchers in specific projects supported by the EU budget.
The current cooperation of the EU and China in the area of science and technology has been made available by the Horizon 2020 program. The Horizon 2020 initiative by the European Commission addresses the following areas: (i) food, agriculture and biotechnology (FAB); (ii) sustainable urbanization; (iii) energy; (iv) aeronautics; (v) and other areas including ICT, water, health, society, polar research, sme instrument, and space.

Debt purchases 
During the European debt crisis, several European countries required the EU and International Monetary Fund bailouts. China assisted Europe by buying billions of euros' worth of junk Eurozone bonds; in particular from Greece, Ireland, Italy, Portugal and Spain. Some analysts suggested China was buying political influence in the EU but China maintains they are building strong trade ties and supporting the European economy so that trade issues can move ahead more smoothly.

Conflicts

EU anti-dumping measures 
The EU has put in place numerous anti-dumping measures to protect its market from cheap products from China, especially steel.

Arms embargo 

The EU arms embargo on China was imposed by the EU on China in response to its suppression of the Tiananmen Square protests of 1989. China stated its position that the embargo be removed, describing it "very puzzling" and amounting to "political discrimination". In January 2010, China again requested that the embargo be removed.

Internal EU divisions 
A leaked US cable indicated the internal divisions in the EU on the ban during negotiations in 2004. France viewed the ban as anachronistic and refused to consider attaching reforms in China as a condition, stating that "China would not accept human rights conditionality." Austria, Belgium, Czechia, Greece, Italy and the UK were all broadly in the French camp. Germany, Denmark, the Netherlands and Sweden wished to attach a lifting of the ban to "specific Chinese steps on human rights." All agreed in principle that if certain conditions were met then the ban should be lifted. Various EU heads of state have objected to the embargo or supported its continued existence. German Chancellor Angela Merkel has previously indicated her opposition to a lifting of the embargo, whereas her predecessor, Gerhard Schröder, had been in favour.

The European Parliament has been consistently against removing the embargo. However, High Representative Catherine Ashton put forward plans for lifting the embargo in 2010, arguing that "The current arms embargo is a major impediment for developing stronger EU-China co-operation on foreign policy and security matters." Chinese ambassador to the EU Song Zhe agreed, noting that "it doesn't make any sense to maintain the embargo."

Outside pressure 
The United States, which also has an arms embargo on China, states that lifting the embargo will create a technology transfer that will increase the capabilities of the People's Liberation Army. The US has been influential in keeping the EU ban in place. The US sees China as a potential military threat and has pressured the EU in keeping it in place. In 2011 the Chinese EU ambassador suggested that in the future "the EU should make decisions on its own."

Similarly, Japan is equally as against any attempt to remove arms restrictions to China. Japan's government, particularly right-wing members of the cabinet, indicate that any such move will alter the balance of power in Southeast Asia strongly in favour of China at Japan's expense. China described Japan's position as provocative. Meanwhile, Japan stated that the EU's proposal to lift the embargo in 2010 was a mistake in which caused great concern to Japan.

In 2020 and 2021, the Comprehensive Agreement on Investment drew a "firestorm of criticism" from US politicians and political commentators, who complained that the EU had not consulted the US before agreeing to the deal. However, as the US itself had signed a trade agreement with China a year prior without first having consulted the EU, the criticism was largely dismissed as being "hypocritical". Additionally, the Biden administration has claimed that the US will be "at the head of the table again", which some analysts say might be viewed as a threat towards the EU's goal of strategic autonomy from the US by implying that the European Union "[should] play second-fiddle to Washington".

Other trade 
Whilst the embargo remains, China buys much of its arms from Russia. China had turned to Israel for surveillance planes in 2007, but under pressure from the U.S., Israel refused to go through with the deal. Despite the ban, another leaked US cable suggested that in 2003 the EU sold €400 million of "defence exports" to China, and later approved other sales of military grade submarine and radar technology.

Chinese cyber-attacks 
On 22 June 2020, amid the ongoing COVID-19 pandemic, EU Commission President Ursula von der Leyen called out the People's Republic of China for allegedly conducting cyberattacks against EU hospitals and health care institutions.

COVID-19 pandemic 
During the COVID-19 pandemic, a number of EU countries bought medical equipment including personal protective equipment and test kits from China, a number of which were found to be defective. Due to the defective medical equipment and for China having initially failed to disclose information on the COVID-19 virus, on 21 April 2020 a cross party group of 10 MEPs wrote to the President of the European Council, Ursula von der Leyen and EU High Representative Josep Borrell requesting they take action against China. On 1 May 2020, the EC President Ursula von der Leyen backed investigation into the coronavirus origin. By 17 May 2020, a coalition of 62 countries backed a joint Australian, EU push for an independent inquiry into the COVID-19 outbreak.

Human rights 
On 6 October 2020, a group of 39 countries, including most of the EU member states, issued a statement denouncing the Chinese government for its treatment of ethnic minorities and for curtailing freedoms in Hong Kong.

In December 2020, France said it will oppose the proposed Comprehensive Agreement on Investment between China and the European Union over the use of forced labour of Uyghurs. In January 2021, France's junior minister for trade Franck Riester said that France "will sign, the European Union will sign [the investment agreement] with the provision noted in the text, which is to make sustained and continuous efforts for ratification" of an International Labour Organization convention banning forced labour.

On 30 March 2022, the Human Rights Watch urged that European Union leaders should announce specific policy responses to the Chinese government's atrocity crimes. A virtual summit between the EU and China was scheduled for 1 April. The European Parliament has been a staunch critic of the Chinese government's crackdown and has repeatedly denounced its abuses.

Russian invasion of Ukraine 

China's relations with Europe became challenging following the 2022 Russian invasion of Ukraine when the US accused both Moscow and Beijing of aligning themselves. According to a New York Times report on February 25, 2022, the US government shared intelligence with China on Russia's troop buildup over three months and beseeched China to tell Russia not to invade, which Chinese officials rebuffed, saying they did not think an invasion was in the works, while sharing the information with Russia. On March 2, the New York Times reported that a Western intelligence report indicated that Chinese officials had asked Putin to delay the invasion till after the 2022 Winter Olympics China was hosting. The Guardian reported a source confirmed the claim to Reuters, but that the Chinese embassy in Washington vehemently denied it as a 'smear' to blame China. Richard McGregor wrote that China was "struggling to settle on a clear message over Ukraine" because it was "trying to reconcile the irreconcilable" between Russia and Ukraine.

Comparison

China's foreign relations with EU member states

  Austria
  Belgium
  Bulgaria
  Croatia
  Cyprus
  Czech Republic
  Denmark
  Estonia
  Finland
  France
  Germany
  Greece
  Hungary
  Ireland
  Italy
  Latvia
  Lithuania
  Luxembourg
  Malta
  Netherlands
  Poland
  Portugal
  Romania
  Slovakia
  Slovenia
  Spain
  Sweden

See also 
 Foreign relations of China
 Foreign relations of the European Union
 Comprehensive Agreement on Investment

References

Further reading

 The China Quarterly, Special Issue: China and Europe since 1978: A European Perspective No. 169 (March 2002).
 Clyde, Paul Hibbert, and Burton F. Beers. The Far East: A History of Western Impacts and Eastern Responses, 1830-1975 (1975). online
 Cotterell, Arthur. Western Power in Asia: Its Slow Rise and Swift Fall, 1415 - 1999 (2009) popular history;  excerpt
 Hu, S. “Structural Constraints on the EU’s Role in Cross-Taiwan Strait Relations,” European Journal of East Asian Studies, Vol. 10, No. 1 (2011): pp. 37–57.
 Hughes, Alex.  France/China: intercultural imaginings (2007)  online
 Kirby, William C. Germany and Republican China (Stanford UP, 1984).
 Mak, Ricardo K, S. et al. eds. Sino-German Relations since 1800: Multidisciplinary Explorations (Frankfurt: Peter Lang, 2000)
 Miskimmon, Alister  et al. eds.  One Belt, One Road, One Story?: Towards an EU-China Strategic Narrative (Palgrave Macmillan, 2020)
 Möller, Kay. "Germany and China: a continental temptation." China Quarterly 147 (1996): 706–725, covers 1960 to 1995.
 Picciau, S. "The 'One Belt One Road' Strategy Between Opportunities & Fears: A New Stage in EU-China Relations?" IndraStra Global Vol. 002, No. 02 (2016): 0066, ISSN 2381-3652, The "One Belt One Road" Strategy Between Opportunities & Fears: A New Stage in EU-China Relations?
 Shambaugh, David, Eberhard Sandschneider, and Zhou Hong, eds. China-Europe relations: perceptions, policies and prospects (Routledge, 2007). excerpt
 Smith, Julianne, and Torrey Taussig. "The Old World and the Middle Kingdom: Europe Wakes up to China's Rise." Foreign Affairs 98 (2019): 112–124. online.
 Wellons, Patricia. "Sino‐French relations: Historical alliance vs. economic reality." Pacific Review 7.3 (1994): 341–348.
 Weske, Simone. "The role of France and Germany in EU-China relations." CAP Working Paper (2007) online.
 Westad, Odd Arne. Restless Empire: China in the world since 1750 (2012) 
 Zhou, Hong ed. China-EU Relations: Reassessing the China-EU Comprehensive Strategic Partnership (Springer Singapore, 2017)

External links
EU-China Relations factsheet, European External Action Service

 
China
Foreign relations of China